The Orto Botanico dell'Università di Catania (16,000 m2), also known as the Hortus Botanicus Catinensis, is a botanical garden in Catania, Sicily, southern Italy. It is operated by the University of Catania botany department. This institution is a member of BGCI, with international identification code
CAT.

History
Realization of a garden was first attempted in 1847 with a purchase of land on the city outskirts, but the revolutions of 1848 rapidly led to its dispersion. In 1858 the garden was established by founder and director, Benedictine Monk and botanist Francis Roccaforte Tornabene (1813–1897), with first plantings in 1862 of specimens obtained from other botanical gardens in Sweden, France, Naples, and Palermo. It was enlarged in 1865 with a new area dedicated to cultivation of indigenous Sicilian species, and in the early 1900s further enhanced by creation of the Giardino Botanico "Nuova Gussonea" on Mount Etna for cultivation of native mountain plants. The main garden was damaged during World War II, and its great Tepidario greenhouse demolished in 1958, but in subsequent years it has been renewed.

Overview
Today the garden is divided into two main sections: the Hortus Generalis (13,000 m2) which collects mainly exotic plants, and the Hortus Siculus (3000 m2) which cultivates Sicilian species. The Hortus Generalis is divided into squares, set off by limestone steps, with two small greenhouses for succulents, a tropical greenhouse used primarily for reproduction of palms by seed and for cultivation of exotic plants, and three circular tanks for aquatic plants. The Hortus Siculus is divided into narrow rectangular flower beds bordered with lava stone, containing plants arranged by family. The garden also contains a handsome departmental building in neoclassical style.

The garden's main collections are as follows:
 Succulent plants - thousands of specimens, most grown outdoors. The collection was first created by Tornabene, and in 1963 enlarged by 4,000 new specimens. Today it contains about 2,000 species, mainly Cactaceae, Euphorbiaceae, and Aizoaceae. Of particular interest are its Astrophytum capricorne, Blossfeldia liliputana, Cereus, Echinocactus grusonii, Leuchtenbergia principis, Lophophora williamsii, Mammillaria herrerae, Mammillaria schiedeana, Mammillaria theresae, Melocatus jansenianus, Roseocactus fissuratus, and Toumeya papyracantha, as well as Euphorbia abyssinica, Euphorbia candelabrum, Euphorbia trigona, Euphorbia coerulescens, Euphorbia resinifera, and Caralluma europaea, Crassula brevifolia, Crassula falcata, and Stapelia.
 Palms - about fifty species, representing Arecastrum, Arykuryroba, Butia, Chamaedorea, Chamaerops, Erithea, Howea, Livistona, Phoenix, Sabal, Trithrinax, Trachycarpus, Washingtonia, etc., with notable specimens of Arecastrum romanzoffianum, Butia eriospatha, Brahea dulcis, Dypsis onilahensis, Jubaea chilensis, Medemia argun, Rhopalostylis sapida, Pritchardia hillebrandii, Sabal acauli, Trithrinax campestris, Trithrinax brasiliensis, Wallichia densiflora, and Washingtonia robusta.
 Sicilian plants - including Abies nebrodensis, Anthemis ismelia, Brassica, Celtis aetnensis, Centaurea tauromenitana, Cremnophyton lanfrancoi, Darniella melitensis, Cheirolophus crassifolius, Salix gussonei, Scilla cupani, Scilla dimartinoi, Scilla sicula, Senecio ambiguus, and Zelkova sicula.
 Trees and shrubs - including Bupleurum fruticosum, Ceratonia siliqua, Chamaerops humilis, Cistus creticus, Dracaena draco, Erica multiflora, Fontanesia phillyreoides, Myrtus communis, Quercus ilex, Phillyrea angustifolia, Pinus pinea, Pistacia lentiscus, Populus alba, Ulmus canescens, and Vitex agnus-castus.
 Exotic species - including Agathis australis, Agave americana, Ceratozamia mexicana, Eriobotrya japonica, Macrozamia moorei, Morus alba, and Prunus armeniaca.

See also 
 List of botanical gardens in Italy
 iPhone App

References 

  Official Web Site
  Informations from the section of Botanical Department - University of Catania
  Tab on the site of Grandi Giardini Italiani
 F. Tornabene, Hortus botanicus regiae Universitatis studiorum Catinae, F. Galati, Catania, 1887.
 V. Gicomini, "Un secolo di vita scientifica dell'Orto Botanico dell'Università di Catania (1858-1958)", Boll. Ist. Univ. Catania, ser. II, vol. 2: I-LII, Catania, 1958.
 A. Gugliemo and P. Pavone, "La collezione di piante succulente dell’Orto Botanico dell'Università di Catania", Il Naturalista Siciliano, ser. IV, 5 (1-2): 1-20, Palermo, 1981.
 A. Gugliemo and P. Pavone, L'Orto Botanico di Catania, 1st edition Arti Grafiche Signorello, Catania, 1988; 2nd edition (1994), 3rd edition (1995) Litotipografia Vena, Palermo.

University of Catania
Buildings and structures in Catania
Botanical gardens in Italy
Gardens in Sicily
Buildings and structures completed in 1858
1858 establishments in Italy
19th-century architecture in Italy